Ready For Love is the third English studio album by Thai pop singer Tata Young, released on August 25, 2009. The album's first single, "Ready For Love", was written by Alex Smith, Mark Taylor and Ayak Thiik and produced by André Brix Buchman from Valicon Company in Germany. It also features a track "Perfection" co-written by Leona Lewis along with many of the tracks written by internationally acclaimed songwriters.

Concept
The album is a rhythm-and-blues and dance-pop take on 12 tunes from songwriters around the world.

The title track, which had been airing for a couple of weeks, "feels cool and energetic like in the '60s", Tata says, saying she learned the "big voice" techniques of American R&B singers Aretha Franklin, Beyoncé and Jennifer Hudson. "My Bloody Valentine," written by Alex James (Alexandra Burke, Charice, Adam Lambert) and Busbee (Toni Braxton, Jonas Brothers, Alexandra Burke) was released as a follow-up single. "Mission is You" and "Shine Like a Superstar" are Silom Soi 2-style rousers. "Burning Out" and "Suffocate" get melancholic. "Ugly" is a return to the catchy form of "Sexy, Naughty, Bitchy" and "Love is the Law" sounds like Madonna's "Rain". Tata calls "Boys Will Be Boys" her favourite track, and "Exposed" the "opposite of her real life."  "It isn't me, but the Sony bosses in Europe said it's gonna be a hit there." The song is about a small-town girl who's dumped by her lover after she becomes famous.

Promotions and tours

A massive advertising campaign pushed "Ready for Love" across Asia. Indonesia, the Philippines, Malaysia, Hong Kong, India, Singapore and Japan received an unprecedented level of promotion for an album by a Thai pop artist.

For the first time, Tata Young broke into the Australian and European markets. Her first taste of Australian audiences came in October 2009, when she performed three songs from her new album at the One Movement music festival in Perth, Western Australia.

Track listing

Charts

Release history

References

External links
 Tata Young's official website
 Album review of "Ready For Love"

Tata Young albums
2009 albums